The Fauves is the seventh studio album by Mornington Peninsula, Melbourne indie band The Fauves.

The album is notable for its brevity and the fact that it only contains three songs by Phil Leonard ("The Doctor").

Cox said, "It came together relatively quickly. We wrote the songs over a period of a few months then learnt them really quickly and then recorded it really quickly. With this record we didn't want to over-think it. Our last couple of albums had more instrumentation on them with the keyboards but we've stripped this one back to guitar bass and drums. It's a much rawer record than the others."

Track listing
All songs by The Fauves
 "Smoking Again" 
 "Weak Chin" 
 "Slow Decline" 
 "Metrosexual" 
 "You Wanted It" 
 "On The Couch"  
 "Over The Line"
 "Get F***ed" 
 "Jesus & Money" 
 "Big Summer For Me" 
 "Shouldn't Have Read Your Diary"

Personnel

 Andrew Cox - Guitar, vocals
 Philip Leonard - Guitar, vocals
 Adam Newey - Drums, vocals
 Timothy Cleaver - Bass, vocals

References

The Fauves albums
2004 albums